Souk Es Sabbaghine El Saghir or small Dyers market is one of the souks of the medina of Tunis.

Etymology 

The souk is a small alley in Souk Es Sabbaghine. That's why it is called Souk El Saghir (the small market).

Location 
It links Souk Es Sabbaghine (the big market) to Sidi Zahmoul Street.

It is situated in the outskirt of the medina of Tunis, far from Al-Zaytuna Mosque center because dyeing is considered as a polluting activity.

History 
Few informations are clear about this souk's history. But it is considered as an extension of the main one (Souk Es Sabbaghine).

There are still some dyeing shops in it.

Notes and references 

Sabbaghine El Saghir